{{Automatic_taxobox
| image = Cerambycidae - Acalolepta australis.JPG
| image_caption = Acalolepta australis from New Guinea. Male and female
| taxon = Acalolepta
| authority = Pascoe, 1858
| synonyms =
 Astynoscelis Pic, 1905
 Dihammus J. Thomson, 1864
 Haplohammus Bates, 1884
 Neanthes Pascoe, 1878
 Niphohammus Matsushita, 1932
 Saitoa Matsushita, 1937
}}Acalolepta'' is a genus of flat-faced longhorns beetle belonging to the family Cerambycidae, subfamily Lamiinae. Its members are found in the Indomalayan realm.

List of species

References

 F. Vitali Notes on the genus Acalolepta Pascoe, 1858 (Coleoptera: Cerambycidae) from Indonesian Papua and the Moluccas
 Biolib

External links
 Sound recording of Acalolepta at BioAcoustica

 
Lamiini
Cerambycidae genera
Taxa named by Francis Polkinghorne Pascoe